Peristeria is a genus of plants of the family Orchidaceae commonly called dove orchid or Holy Ghost orchid. In line with the common name, the genus' name is from the Greek word peristerion meaning "from dove". According to the Royal Horticultural Society, Per is the official orchid abbreviation for this genus. In nature, it is found across much of South America as well as in Panama, Costa Rica and Trinidad.

Peristeria elata is the national flower of Panama and is extremely over-collected in its native habitat. This over collection has led to its status as a species threatened with extinction delineated in Appendix I of CITES. In its native habitat, Peristeria can usually be found growing near the edge of hardwood forests. In the fall, after the trees in the hardwood forest lose their leaves, the plants are exposed to full sun throughout the cool, dry winter. Species in this genus are either epiphytic or terrestrial in growth habit.

References

 Missouri Botanical Garden w3 TROPICOS
 Peristeria in World Checklist of Orchidaceae. Board of Trustees of the Royal Botanic Gardens, Kew.

External links
 
 
 Royal Horticultural Society: Registration of Orchids

Coeliopsidinae genera
 
Epiphytic orchids